The  was a rapid reaction force of the Tokyo Metropolitan Police Department (TMPD) in the pre-World War II era. This unit were interpreted as a Japanese counterpart of the New York City Police Department Emergency Service Unit.

History
The strength was 307 officers, divided into four companies. Acting as a SWAT team of the TMPD, they were equipped with a jō, tantō and FN Model 1910 semi-automatic pistol while ordinary police officers had only a sabre. And a bulletproof vest was also equipped as needed. They were popular as "Shinsengumi in the Shōwa period" even among the common people.

References 

Defunct police units of the Tokyo Metropolitan Police Department
Politics of the Empire of Japan
1933 establishments in Japan